Daljit Singh was an Indian politician who served in the Delhi Legislative Assembly following the 1951 election. Singh stood as the Indian National Congress candidate in the Safdar Jang constituency. He won the seat, having obtained 5,870 votes (81.21% of the votes in the constituency).

Singh lived on Queensway in New Delhi. He was the youngest brother of Khushwant Singh.

References

Indian National Congress politicians
Members of the Delhi Legislative Assembly
Year of birth missing
Year of death missing